William de Skelton was an English college fellow and university chancellor.

William de Skelton was a Fellow of Merton College, Oxford. Between 1339 and 1341, he was Chancellor of the University of Oxford.

References

Year of birth unknown
Year of death unknown
Fellows of Merton College, Oxford
Chancellors of the University of Oxford
14th-century English people
14th-century Roman Catholics